Ade Monsbourgh AO (1917–2006) is an Australian jazz musician known as "Lazy Ade" or "Father Ade". He was part of the trad jazz movement and primarily played clarinet and alto.

In the 1992 Australia Day Honours, Monsbourgh was made an Officer of the Order of Australia (AO) for "service to music, particularly jazz as a performer and composer".

Hall of Fame

Australian Jazz Bell Awards
The Australian Jazz Bell Awards, (also known as the Bell Awards or The Bells), are annual music awards for the jazz music genre in Australia. They commenced in 2003.

|-
| 2003
| Ade Monsbourgh
| Hall of Fame
| 
|-

References

1917 births
2006 deaths
Australian musicians
Officers of the Order of Australia